Cornel Buta (born 1 November 1977) is a Romanian retired footballer. He played as a right back and occasionally as a libero.

Club career
He started his professional career at FC Brașov, playing in the first two football leagues in Romania. After three and a half seasons he transferred to Dinamo București as a replacement for Cosmin Contra, who moved to Deportivo Alavés earlier. He stayed only a few months, however, and at the beginning of the next season he moved to Rapid București, where he still could not confirm. As a result, he returned to FC Braşov, where he played for another season and a half.

After further spells at Rapid, twice, and FC Naţional, Buta played in Ukraine, at FC Volyn Lutsk, before returning in Romania, at Pandurii Târgu-Jiu. After a full season played, his next club would be Politehnica Iaşi, moving there as a free agent.

In his career, he won 4 trophies: Divizia A in 2000 with Dinamo, the Romanian Cup in 2000 with Dinamo and in 2002 with Rapid, and the Romanian Supercup in 2002 with Rapid

Honours

FC Braşov
Liga II: 1998–99
Dinamo București
Liga I: 1999–00
Romanian Cup: 1999–00
Rapid București
Liga I: 2002–03
Romanian Cup: 2001–02
Supercupa României: 2002, 2003

References

External links

1977 births
Living people
Sportspeople from Vaslui
Association football defenders
People from Vaslui County
Romanian footballers
Romania international footballers
Romanian expatriate footballers
Expatriate footballers in Ukraine
Romanian expatriate sportspeople in Ukraine
FC Brașov (1936) players
FC Dinamo București players
FC Rapid București players
FC Progresul București players
FC Volyn Lutsk players
FC Politehnica Iași (1945) players
CS Pandurii Târgu Jiu players
Liga I players
Liga II players
Ukrainian Premier League players